Edmund Lester was an English professional footballer who played as a centre forward. He played for Lancashire League club Fleetwood Rangers before moving to Football League First Division side Burnley in March 1898. He played his only senior match for Burnley on 1 April 1899 in the 1–0 defeat away at Sheffield Wednesday. Lester left the club in May 1899, and his whereabouts thereafter are untraced.

References

Year of birth missing
Year of death missing
English footballers
Association football forwards
Fleetwood Rangers F.C. players
Burnley F.C. players
English Football League players